Johan Ivarsson (born 6 July 1995) is a Swedish professional ice hockey defenceman. He is currently playing for Södertälje SK of the HockeyAllsvenskan league. He previously has played with Färjestad BK in the SHL and Malmö Redhawks.

References

External links
 

1995 births
Living people
Färjestad BK players
Malmö Redhawks players
Swedish ice hockey defencemen